Rebellion is a professional wrestling pay-per-view event produced by Impact Wrestling, which is annually held during the month of April. The event was first held in 2019 and it has since become one of the promotion's "Big Four" events (along with Hard to Kill, Slammiversary, and Bound for Glory).

Events

History

2019 

The inaugural Rebellion event took place on April 28, 2019 at The Rebel Complex in Toronto, Ontario, Canada and did 2,200 buys. Eight professional wrestling matches were contested at the event. The main event was a Full Metal Mayhem match for the Impact World Tag Team Championship, in which The Lucha Brothers (Pentagón Jr. and Fénix) defended the titles against The Latin American Xchange (Santana and Ortiz). LAX won the highly acclaimed match and the tag team titles, marking Lucha Brothers' last match in Impact.

The undercard also notably saw Brian Cage defeat Johnny Impact to capture his first Impact World Championship, Michael Elgin's Impact debut by attacking Cage after the match and Tessa Blanchard defeating Gail Kim in what would be Kim's retirement match, which was considered Kim's "passing of the torch" to Blanchard and also marked the beginning of Blanchard's rise as the company's most popular wrestler and her gradual rise to main event status.

2020 

On January 13, 2020, Impact Wrestling announced on its Twitter account that it would be holding a second Rebellion event in April at Terminal 5 in New York, New York. It was later announced that the event would take place on April 19. Due to the COVID-19 pandemic, however, the event was rescheduled and taped on a closed set at Skyway Studios in Nashville, Tennessee between April 8 and 10. It aired on tape delay as a two-part special episode of Impact! on April 21 and 28.

Impact World Champion Tessa Blanchard was unable to attend the tapings, thus canceling the event's planned world championship match in which she was to defend the title against Michael Elgin and Eddie Edwards. In the main event of the April 21 broadcast, Ken Shamrock defeated Sami Callihan by technical submission in an unsanctioned match, while in the main event of the April 28 broadcast, Moose defeated Hernandez and Michael Elgin in a three-way match. After the match, Moose declared himself the TNA World Heavyweight Champion.

References

External links
Impact Wrestling

 
Recurring events established in 2019